The Souvenir Jacques Goddet is an award and cash prize in the Tour de France bicycle race that began in 2001. The Souvenir is named in honour of the historically second Tour de France director and French sports journalist Jacques Goddet. It is awarded to the first rider to reach the summit of the -high Col du Tourmalet mountain pass in the Pyrenees, apart from the 2002 Tour when the Col d'Aubisque was used. A monument to Goddet was erected at the summit soon after his death in 2000. Since 2003, the cash prize is €5,000. In 2019, Thibaut Pinot became the first repeat winner of the prize.

List of winners

Notes

References

Tour de France classifications and awards